The Oldendorfer Totenstatt is a group of six burial mounds and megalith sites in Oldendorf north of Amelinghausen in the valley of the River Luhe in Lüneburg district in the German state of Lower Saxony. It consists of dolmens (sites 1, 3 and 4) and tumuli (sites 2, 5 and 6).

Sites 1, 3 and 4 

Site 1 is a 45 m long dolmen, most of which has been destroyed.
Site 3 is the remains of the earth embankment, still 43 m long. Most of its external stones are still there, either in situ or overturned. The chamber must have been located in the section that no longer exists.
Site 4 is an 80 m long dolmen. It originally had about 100 external stones, 14 of which are still in situ, the remainder were put back during its restoration (some with dry stone walling filling the gaps). The passage grave consisted of a roughly 8 m long chamber with 12 upright supporting stones and a pair of passageway stones. The original five capstones of the chamber as well as the capstone for the passage are missing. The location of the chamber in the dolmen is right at the end, likewise the side entrance to the chamber is offset well to the end, so that the site is classified as one of the so-called Holsteiner Kammer ("Holstein Chamber") type.

Sites 2, 5 and 6 
Site 2 is a tumulus about 20 m in diameter in the centre of which the remains (the uprights and the joist (Schwellenstein)) of a passage grave are located.
Sites 5 and 6 are Bronze Age tumuli.

Finds 
Inside the chamber of site 2 and 4 were found relicts of Funnelbeaker, Globular amphora and Corded Ware cultures at different levels.

Literature 
Laux F.: Die Steingräber von Oldendorf an der Luhe In: Körner G. (ed.) Dokumentation zur Archäologie Niedersachsens in Denkmalpflege und Forschung, 1975

External links 

The Oldendorf Totenstatt at www.oldendorf-luhe.de

Sacral architecture
Megalithic monuments in Germany
Lüneburg Heath
Lüneburg (district)
Funnelbeaker culture
Tumuli in Germany
Archaeology of Lower Saxony
Globular Amphora culture